Vent is a dark comedy series produced for BBC Radio 4 in 2006.  It is written by Nigel Smith.  The producer is Gareth Edwards.

The story revolves around an unsuccessful writer named Ben Smith (Neil Pearson), who is in a coma.  While his wife Mary (Fiona Allen) and his mother (Josie Lawrence) hash out their emotional issues at his bedside, he lives in a fantasy world with his 2-year-old daughter "Blitzkrieg" (real name Beatrice; Leslie Ash), miraculously grown up, and remembers incidents from his life.  An imaginary sitcom, apparently written by Ben and concerning a coma ward in a hospital, plays in the background.

A second series of 6 episodes began broadcasting on BBC Radio 4 on 25 September 2007.  A third series describing Ben's return home, still clinging to his fantasy life, began broadcasting on BBC Radio 4 on 24 November 2009.

While the flashbacks in the first series concern Ben and Mary's courtship, pursued somewhat reluctantly on Mary's part, the second series shows the slow process of recovery for Ben in parallel with their marriage, her pregnancy, and Ben's lapses of commitment.  Ben's fantasy life revolves around him giving up total control of his fantasy world before returning to a real world where he has no control at all.

The third series was preceded by an interlude episode broadcast as the Friday Play on 20 November.  In this episode Ben is out of his coma but is suffering from locked-in syndrome.  He still experiences memories and fantasies while his wife and mother try to communicate with him.  Meanwhile the hospital authorities are considering whether to continue with rehabilitation or ship him to a care home.

Writer Nigel Smith spent some time in a coma himself, later describing it in an article in The Times  and in an autobiography published in 2007.

Episodes

Series One

Series Two

Special

Series Three

See also
 Brian Gulliver's Travels

References

External links
 (BBC Radio 4 Extra site)

Episode Guide, Cast List, Synopsis and Broadcast Dates

BBC Radio comedy programmes
BBC Radio 4 programmes
2006 radio programme debuts